Mirza Muhammad Akbar (Persian: میرزا محمد اکبر) (11 September 1657 – 31 March 1706) was a Mughal prince and the fourth son of Emperor Aurangzeb and his chief consort Dilras Banu Begum. Akbar led a rebellion against his father and fled the Deccan after the failure of that venture. He later went into exile to Persia, where he died. He was the father of Nikusiyar, who was Mughal emperor for a few months in 1719.

Early life

Muhammad Akbar was born on 11 September 1657 in Aurangabad to Prince Muhiuddin (later known as 'Aurangzeb' upon his accession) and his first wife and chief consort Dilras Banu Begum. His mother was a princess of the prominent Safavid dynasty of Iran (Persia) and was the daughter of Mirza Badi-uz-Zaman Safavi, the Viceroy of Gujarat. Dilras died when Akbar was only one month old. For this reason, Akbar was brought up with special care and affection by his father and his oldest sister, Princess Zeb-un-Nissa. Akbar was his father's best-loved son as Aurangzeb, himself, said in a letter to him, "God be my witness that I have loved you more than my other sons."

Akbar's siblings included his older sisters, Zeb-un-Nissa, Zinat-un-Nissa and Zubdat-un-Nissa and his older brother, Azam Shah. Like other Mughal princes, Muhammad Akbar administered various provinces and fought minor campaigns under the guidance of experienced officers. His first independent command was during Aurangzeb's war of the Jodhpur succession.

Marriages
On 18 June 1672, Akbar was wedded to a granddaughter of his paternal uncle, Dara Shikoh, who had been killed at Aurangzeb's behest. Princess Salima Banu Begum was the eldest daughter of Prince Sulaiman Shikoh, the eldest son of Dara Shikoh. Later, Akbar also married a daughter of an Assamese nobleman. He was the father of two sons and two daughters, including Nikusiyar, who briefly became Mughal emperor in 1719.

The Rajput War
Maharaja Jaswant Singh, who was Maharaja of Jodhpur, was also a high-ranking Mughal officer. He died at his post on the Khyber Pass on 10 December 1678 without leaving a male issue; two of his wives were pregnant at the time of his death. His succession was thus unclear. When the news of the death reached Aurangzeb, he immediately dispatched a large army (on 9 January 1679) to occupy the state of Jodhpur. One of the divisions of this army was commanded by Akbar.

Aurangzeb occupied Jodhpur ostensibly to secure the succession for any male infant born to Jaswant's pregnant widows. He declared that such rightful heir would be invested with his patrimony upon coming of age. However, relations between Jaswant and Aurangzeb had not been good, and it was feared that Aurangzeb would annex the state on this pretext. Indeed, incumbent officers in Jodhpur state were replaced by Mughal officers. After thus effectively annexing the largest Hindu state in northern India, Aurangzeb reimposed the jaziya tax on the non-Muslim population (2 April 1679), almost a century after it had been abolished by his tolerant ancestor Akbar I. All this made the emperor extremely unpopular among the Rajputs.

One of Jaswant's pregnant wives delivered a son, who was named Ajit Singh. Officers loyal to Jaswant brought his family back to Jodhpur and rallied the clan to the standards of the infant. The Rajputs of Jodhpur (Rathore clan) forged an alliance with the neighboring Rajputs of Mewar (Sisodia clan). Maharana Raj Singh of Mewar withdrew his army to the western portion of his kingdom, marked by the rugged Aravalli hills and secured by numerous hill-forts. From this position, the smaller but faster Rajput cavalry units could surprise the Mughal outposts in the plains, loot their supply trains, and bypass their camps to ravage neighbouring Mughal provinces.

In the second half of 1680, after several months of such setbacks, Aurangzeb decided on an all-out offensive. Niccolao Manucci, an Italian gunner in the Mughal army, says: "for this campaign, Aurangzeb put in pledge the whole of his kingdom." Three separate armies, under Aurangzeb's sons Akbar, Azam and Muazzam, penetrated the Aravalli hills from different directions. However, their artillery lost its effectiveness while being dragged around the rugged hills and both Azam and Muazzam were defeated by the Rajputs and retreated.

Akbar's rebellion
Akbar and his general Tahawwur Khan had been instructed to try to bribe the Rajput nobles to the Mughal side, but in these attempts, they themselves were ensnared by the Rajputs. The Rajputs incited Akbar to rebel against his father and offered all support. They pointed out to him that Aurangzeb's attempt to annex the Rajput states was disturbing the stability of the sub-continent. They also reminded him that the open bigotry displayed by Aurangzeb in reimposing jaziya and demolishing temples was contrary to the wise policies of his ancestors. Acoording to Bhimsen, he is also supposed to have written to his father:

<Blockquote>On the Hindu community [firqa] two calamities have descended, the exaction of Jizya in the towns and the oppression of the enemy in the countryside.<ref>{{Citation|work='Xenophobia in the Seventeenth-century India'|editor-last1=Kruijtzer|editor-first1=Gjis|page=200|url=https://archive.org/details/xenophobia-in-seventeenth-century-india-pdfdrive-2022-03-12-t-164521.205/page/200/mode/1up?view=theater|publisher=Leiden University press|year=2009|title=Muhammmad Akbar|isbn=9087280688}}</ref> 
</blockquote>

Prince Akbar lent a willing ear to the Rajputs and promised to restore the policies of the illustrious Akbar. On 1 January 1681, Akbar declared himself Emperor, issued a manifesto deposing his father, and marched towards Ajmer to fight him.

As the commander of a Mughal division, Akbar had a force of 12,000 cavalry with supporting infantry and artillery. To this, the Maharana of Mewar added 6,000 Rajput cavalry, being half his own army. As this combined army crossed Jodhpur state, numerous war-bands of Rathores joined up and increased its strength to 25,000 cavalry. Meanwhile, various Mughal divisions deployed around the Aravalli hills had been racing to come to Aurangzeb's aid. Aurangzeb however resorted to threats and treachery: he sent a letter to Tahawwur Khan promising to pardon him but also threatening to have his family publicly dishonored by camp ruffians if he refused to submit. The Mughal noble secretly came over to meet his master but was killed in a scuffle at the entrance to Aurangzeb's tent.

The crafty Mughal Emperor then wrote a false letter to Akbar and arranged it such that the letter was intercepted by the Rajputs. In this letter, Aurangzeb congratulated his son for finally bringing the Rajput guerillas out in the open where they could be crushed by father and son together. The Rajput commanders suspected this letter to be false but took it to Akbar's camp for an explanation. Here they discovered that Tahawwur Khan had disappeared. Suspecting the worst, the Rajputs departed in the middle of the night. The next morning, Akbar woke to find his chief adviser and his allies gone and his own soldiers deserting by the hour to Aurangzeb. The would-be emperor escaped the prospect of war with his father by hastily departing the camp with a few close followers. He caught up with the Rajput commanders and mutual explanations followed.

Aftermath
Seeing that Akbar had attempted no treachery and that he could be useful, the Rathore leader Durgadas took Akbar to the court of the Maratha king  Sambhaji, seeking support for the project of placing him on the throne of Delhi. For a full five years, Akbar stayed with Sambhaji, hoping that the latter would lend him men and money to strike and seize the Mughal throne for himself. But at that time, Sambhaji was occupied with uncovering the conspiracy against him. After this, he was engrossed in wars against Siddhis of Janjira, Chikka Dev Rai of Mysore, Portuguese of Goa and Aurangzeb. In September 1686, Sambhaji sent Akbar to Persia.

In Persia, Akbar was said to pray daily for the early death of his father, which alone would give him another chance to seize the Mughal throne for himself. On hearing of this, Aurangzeb is said to have remarked, "Let us see who dies first. He or I!" As it turned out, Akbar died in 1706, one year before his father's demise, in the town of Mashhad in Persia.

Two of Akbar's children were brought up by the Rajputs, until as a result of peace negotiations, they were handed over to the elderly emperor. Akbar's daughter Safiyat-un-nissa was sent to her grandfather in 1696 and his son Buland Akhtar was returned in 1698. The latter, when presented in court, shocked his grandfather and nobles by speaking fluently in the Rajasthani language.

Ancestry

Legacy
In the words of Sir Jadunath Sarkar:

Notes

References
Jadunath Sarkar, History of Aurangzeb, Vols. 3&4
Manucci, Storia do Mogor.''

External links
Family sketch

Mughal princes
1657 births
1704 deaths
People from Aurangabad, Maharashtra
Burials in Iran
Burials in Mashhad
Burials at Imam Reza Shrine